The Ostrusha mound  is a Thracian burial tumulus near the Bulgarian town of Shipka. It was constructed in the middle of the 4th century BCE. The stone structures under the more than 18 meters high mound form one of the biggest representative tomb-cult complexes with 6 rooms on an area of 100 square meters. It was professionally excavated in 1993.

One of the chambers is fully maintained. It is made of two carved-out solid granite blocks, weighing a total of more than 60 tons. The roof block is divided into dozens of square and circle shaped niches filled with masterfully painted portraits, scenes with people, fighting between animals, plants and geometric decorations. Most of the frescoes are severely damaged apart from a portrait of a young noble woman. A horse with full set of silver appliques as well as a gilded armor collar and two silver vessels were found in one of the other rooms that was not robbed in antiquity.

See also 
Thracian tomb of Aleksandrovo
Thracian tomb of Cotys I
Thracian tomb Golyama Arsenalka
Thracian tomb Griffins
Thracian Tomb of Kazanlak
Thracian tomb Helvetia
Thracian tomb of Seuthes III
Thracian tomb Shushmanets
Thracian Tomb of Sveshtari
Valley of the Thracian Rulers
Roman Tomb (Silistra)

Tombs in Bulgaria
Thracian sites

References
 Проблеми и изследвания на тракийската култура, том І - V

Tombs in Bulgaria
Thracian sites
History of Stara Zagora Province